Princess Christina, Mrs. Magnuson,  (Christina Louise Helena, born 3 August 1943) is the youngest of the four older sisters of King Carl XVI Gustaf of Sweden. She generally uses the name Christina Magnuson.

Early life

Christina was born at Haga Palace outside Stockholm as the fourth child and youngest daughter of Prince Gustaf Adolf, Duke of Västerbotten, and Princess Sibylla of Saxe-Coburg-Gotha. She is the granddaughter of King Gustaf VI Adolf of Sweden.

Family and career
She met her future husband, Tord Magnuson, at a lunch in Stockholm in 1961. Her engagement to Magnuson was announced on 1 February 1974. The couple married on 15 June 1974 in the Palace Church of the Royal Palace of Stockholm.

The couple have three sons: Carl Gustaf Victor (b. 1975), Tord Oscar Frederik (born 1977) and Victor Edmund Lennart (born 1980).

Christina Magnuson chaired the Swedish Red Cross for nine years, and through her friendship with Kjerstin Dellert for many years has been chairman of the Ulriksdal Palace theatre's friendship society.

In January 2023 the princess was seen and heard commenting extensively throughout a two-part documentary broadcast by Sweden's national public service Sveriges Television about the last three kings of Sweden: her brother, grandfather and great-grandfather.

Health
In October 2016, it was announced that Magnuson has been diagnosed with chronic leukemia. It was later made known that she had been cured following stem cell treatment.

Titles, styles and honours

Titles and styles
 3 August 1943 – 1 February 1974: Her Royal Highness Princess Christina of Sweden
 1 February 1974 – Present: Princess Christina, Mrs. Magnuson

National honours 
 : Member Grand Cross of the Royal Order of the Seraphim (LoK av KMO)
 : Member of the Royal Family Decoration of King Gustaf VI Adolf, 1st Class
 : Member of the Royal Family Decoration of King Carl XVI Gustaf, 1st Class
 : Recipient of the Kings Medal, Special Class
 : Recipient of the Prince Carl Medal
 : Recipient of the 90th Birthday Medal of King Gustav V
 : Recipient of the Commemorative Medal of King Gustav V
 : Recipient of the 85th Birthday Medal of King Gustaf VI Adolf
 : Recipient of the 50th Birthday Medal of King Carl XVI Gustaf
 : Recipient of the Wedding Medal of Crown Princess Victoria to Daniel Westling
 : Recipient of the Ruby Jubilee Medal of King Carl XVI Gustaf
 : Recipient of the 70th Birthday Medal of King Carl XVI Gustaf

Foreign honours 
 : Grand Cross of the Order of the Liberator General San Martín
 : Knight of the Order of the Elephant
 : Commander of the Order of the Legion of Honour
 : Grand Cross of the  Order of Merit of the Federal Republic of Germany, 1st Class
 : Grand Cross of the Order of the Falcon
 : Grand Cross of the Order of Merit of the Italian Republic
 : Paulownia Dame Grand Cordon of the Order of the Precious Crown
 : Grand Cross of the Order of the Crown (11 October 2022)
 : Knight Grand Cross of the Order of Saint Olav
 : Grand Cross of the Order of Christ
 : Order of the Yugoslav Great Star

Awards
 : Member Grand Cross of the Social Grand Order of the Amaranth
 : Member Grand Cross of the Social Order of Innocence
  International Red Cross and Red Crescent: Recipient of the Henry Dunant Medal

References

1943 births
Living people
Christina 1943
Christina, Princess
Disinherited European royalty
People from Solna Municipality
Swedish Lutherans
Red Cross personnel
Grand Crosses of the Order of the Liberator General San Martin
Commandeurs of the Légion d'honneur
Grand Crosses 1st class of the Order of Merit of the Federal Republic of Germany
Knights Grand Cross of the Order of the Falcon
Knights Grand Cross of the Order of Merit of the Italian Republic
Grand Cordons of the Order of the Precious Crown
Grand Crosses of the Order of Christ (Portugal)
Grand Crosses of the Order of the Crown (Netherlands)